Alan Davey, CBE (born 12 November 1960) is a British arts administrator, public servant, and civil servant.

Biography
The son of an electrician, Davey grew up in Stockton-on-Tees and attended The Grangefield Academy. He later studied at the University of Birmingham (BA, English, 1982), Merton College, Oxford and Birkbeck, University of London.

Starting as an Administration Trainee in the Department of Health and Social Security in 1985, he was Private Secretary to the Minister of State for Health, 1988–90. He went to the Department of National Heritage in 1992 to head the National Lottery Bill Team. He was Principal Private Secretary to the Secretary of State for National Heritage, 1993–94, then Head of European Business, Medicines Control Agency 1995–97, then secretary of the Royal Commission on Long Term Care, 1997–99.  He was awarded a Fulbright/Helen Hamlyn Scholarship in 1999. After this, at the Department of Culture, Media and Sport, he was Head of Arts Division from January 2001 to April 2004, and subsequently Director of Arts and Culture from May 2004 to December 2007. Davey was chief executive of Arts Council England 2008–14. In January 2015, Davey became controller of BBC Radio 3.  In September 2022, the BBC announced that Davey is to stand down as controller of BBC Radio 3 in March 2023.

Davey was appointed Commander of the Order of the British Empire (CBE) in the 2015 New Year Honours for services to the arts.

References

External links
 LinkedIn profile

Civil servants in the Department of Health and Social Security
Civil servants in the Ministry of Health (United Kingdom)
Civil servants in the Department for Culture, Media and Sport
Civil servants in the Department of National Heritage
1960 births
Living people
Alumni of the University of Birmingham
Alumni of Merton College, Oxford
Commanders of the Order of the British Empire